Åkeshov Palace is located  in  Bromma, a borough of Stockholm, Sweden. Historically, Åkeshov was situated in Bromma socken, which was incorporated with the City of Stockholm in 1916. After having undergone a careful reconstruction, the palace is used today as a hotel and conference facility.

History 

The estate of Åkeshov was originally named Nockeby.  In the 1400s Stockholm district court judge   Peder Ålänning  owned the estate.  Ålänning was one of his times richest people in Stockholm and sometimes worked as a banker for, among others, King Albert of Sweden and Bo Jonsson (Grip). In 1635,  Baron Åke Axelsson  (1594–1655) bought the property and in the early 1640s,  began building the manor house which had not  yet been completed at the time of his death. His daughter Barbro Åkesdotter (1620–1680), wife of Baron Claes Hansson Bielkenstierna (1615–1662), completed the construction.  Their daughter Christina Claesdotter Bielkenstierna (1645–1716) inherited the estate in 1662, but lost the property during the Swedish reduction of 1680.

In the years 1690–1720, Åkeshov was owned by members of the Stenbock family, first by Count Johan Gabriel Stenbock (1640–1705) during the years 1690–1705, then by his cousin, Count Erik Gustaf Stenbock (1662–1722) during the years 1705–1720. The palace was rebuilt in several stages, including the years 1723 and 1740 under the direction of architect Carl Hårleman (1700–1753). Two wing buildings were added during the 1740s.

See also
List of castles and palaces in Sweden

References

External links
Åkeshof Slott Hotell website

Castles in Stockholm County
Manor houses in Sweden